= Dodge Hollow =

Valley in Missouri, United States

Coordinates: 36.9000584°N 93.5724171°W

Dodge Hollow is a valley in the U.S. state of Missouri.

Dodge Hollow has the name of the local Dodge family.
